A referendum was held on 7 April 1984 in the Australian state of Western Australia on the topic of introducing daylight saving. It was the second of four such proposals which have been put to Western Australian voters, and followed a trial over the 1983–1984 summer. The referendum failed to pass, with a 54.35% majority voting against the proposal.

Referendum results 
Question: Are you in favour of the standard time in the State being advanced one hour from the last Sunday in October in each year until the first Sunday in March the following year?

References 

1984
1984 elections in Australia
1984 referendums
Daylight saving time in Australia
1980s in Western Australia
April 1984 events in Australia